Leo Hallerstam (born July 26, 1986 in Stockholm) is a Swedish actor. He has done the voices for several Swedish language dubbed versions of movies and cartoons, including the voice of Charlie Brown and Arthur Read from the TV series of the same name. Leo Hallerstam is son to the actor Staffan Hallerstam.

He played the role of a troubled teenager in the 2004 film Miss Sweden. He played the role of an autistic boy in a 2002 episode of the Swedish TV series Beck – Pojken i glaskulan.

Films 
Miss Sweden as Jens

Dubbed Films 

Recess (TV series) as Mikey Blumberg
Snoopy as Charlie Brown
Mary Poppins as Michael Banks
The Iron Giant as Hogarth Hughes
Harry Potter as Fred and George Weasley
Mi High' as Tom Tupper

 TV series Beck – Pojken i glaskulan as Jack SvenssonTotal Drama Island as DuncanArthur as Arthur ReadMI High as Tom TupperToy Story'' as Andy

References

External links

1986 births
Living people
Male actors from Stockholm
Swedish entertainers